The Campbell Cliffs are a line of high, precipitous cliffs, mostly snow-covered, forming the east wall of Haynes Table in the Hughes Range. They were discovered and photographed by U.S. Navy Operation Highjump on Flight 8A of February 16, 1947, and named by the Advisory Committee on Antarctic Names for Commander Clifford M. Campbell, U.S. Navy, senior officer on this flight.

References
 

Cliffs of the Ross Dependency
Dufek Coast